Cheshmeh-ye Shirin or Cheshmeh Shirin or Chashmeh Shirin may refer to:
 Cheshmeh Shirin, Arsanjan, Fars Province
 Cheshmeh-ye Shirin, Kazerun, Fars Province
 Cheshmeh Shirin, Neyriz, Fars Province
 Cheshmeh Shirin, Darreh Shahr, Ilam Province
 Cheshmeh-ye Shirin Rashnow, Ilam Province
 Cheshmeh-ye Shirin Shah Ahmad, Ilam Province
 Cheshmeh Shirin, Bagh-e Malek, Khuzestan Province
 Cheshmeh Shirin, Dezful, Khuzestan Province
 Cheshmeh Shirin, Masjed Soleyman, Khuzestan Province
 Cheshmeh Shirin-e Vashian, Lorestan Province